St John's Grove, Beeston is a conservation area in Beeston, Nottinghamshire.

History

Following the enclosure of the land surrounding Beeston in 1809 the area of St John's Grove was allotted to the vicar of the parish church.

The first properties erected were Glebe Villas, at 2 and 4 Glebe Street. No 2 was demolished after the Second World War to widen the road as a bus route.

The majority of the houses are of Edwardian and late Victorian origin. The Land Society set conditions for the developers including no public houses, and strict building lines which ensured that properties were set back a consistent distance from the road. In 1994, the St John's Grove Estate became a conservation area.

Architecture
The following table lists the significant properties within the St John’s Grove estate.

References

Conservation areas in Nottinghamshire
Environment of Nottinghamshire
Beeston, Nottinghamshire
Streets in Beeston, Nottinghamshire